Wolfgang Güldenpfennig (born 20 December 1951) is a retired East German rower who competed at the 1972 and 1976 Summer Olympics. In 1972 he won a bronze medal in the single sculls event, whereas in 1976 he became Olympic champion in the quadruple sculls. Güldenpfennig won two world titles in the quadruple sculls, in 1975 and 1977, as well as a European bronze medal in the single sculls in 1973. After retiring from competitions he worked as a rowing coach, training Karl-Heinz Bußert, Uwe Heppner, Uwe Mund and Martin Winter.

References

1951 births
Living people
Sportspeople from Magdeburg
East German male rowers
Olympic rowers of East Germany
Rowers at the 1972 Summer Olympics
Rowers at the 1976 Summer Olympics
Olympic gold medalists for East Germany
Olympic bronze medalists for East Germany
Olympic medalists in rowing
World Rowing Championships medalists for East Germany
Medalists at the 1976 Summer Olympics
Medalists at the 1972 Summer Olympics
Recipients of the Patriotic Order of Merit in silver
European Rowing Championships medalists